Nose tombs ( ko mudeom) are tombs that contain human noses or other body parts that were brought back to Japan as trophies during the Japanese invasions of Korea in the late 16th century. 

War trophies were a part of Japanese tradition at the time and samurai warriors were often paid according to how many they collected. It was the tradition to take the severed head of the enemy but the soldiers resorted to taking noses instead due to the impracticality of transporting them and the huge number of dead bodies.

One such nose tomb was discovered in 1983 in Okayama near Osaka. This tomb held the severed and pickled noses of approximately 20,000 dead Koreans which were eventually returned to Korea in 1992 and cremated. A similar tomb still exists today in Kyoto called the Mimizuka, literally "Ear Mound", although it contains noses and not ears. The use of the term "ear" was suggested by the Confucian scholar Hayashi Razan as a euphemism since nose tomb was considered too barbaric. The noses in the Mimizuka Ear Mound were brought from Korea in barrels of brine and remained in the location for 400 years.

In Japan, these tombs are considered relics by the few who are aware of them, but in Korea these tombs are very well known.

See also 
 Japan-Korea relations
Human trophy collecting

References

Japanese invasions of Korea (1592–1598)
Human trophy collecting
Nose